Carl Heinrich Wilhelm Anthing (11  November 1766 in Saxe-Gotha – 7 February 1823 in The Hague) was a German officer, in the Dutch Army.

Notes

References

Further reading

1766 births
1823 deaths
Royal Netherlands Army generals
Dutch military personnel of the Napoleonic Wars
First French Empire brigadier generals of 1810
Barons of the First French Empire
Knights Third Class of the Military Order of William
Commanders of the Order of the Dannebrog
Commandeurs of the Légion d'honneur